Thomas Charles Bruce (15 February 1825 – 23 November 1890) was a British barrister and a Conservative politician who sat in the House of Commons from 1874 to 1885.

Bruce was the youngest son of the Thomas Bruce, 7th Earl of Elgin, and his wife Elizabeth Oswald, daughter of James Townsend Oswald MP of Dunnikeire, in Fife. He was educated at Jesus College, Cambridge and graduated B.A. and 24th Wrangler in 1850. He became a Fellow of his College and was called to the Bar at the Inner Temple in 1854. In 1860 he was appointed Captain-Commandant of the 32nd Middlesex Rifle Volunteers.

At the 1859 general election Bruce stood unsuccessfully for Parliament in Portsmouth. He stood again at the 1874 general election, and won the seat, holding it until his defeat at the 1885 general election.

Bruce married Sarah Caroline Thornhill, daughter of Sir Thomas Thornhill, 1st Baronet of Riddlesworth Hall, Norfolk in 1863.

He was chairman of the Highland Railway from 1885 to 1890.

References

External links 
 

1825 births
1890 deaths
Alumni of Jesus College, Cambridge
Conservative Party (UK) MPs for English constituencies
Fellows of Jesus College, Cambridge
Highland Railway
Members of the Inner Temple
UK MPs 1874–1880
UK MPs 1880–1885
Volunteer Force officers in Middlesex units
Younger sons of earls
Thomas Charles